Our Lady's Catholic High School is a Roman Catholic secondary school for girls situated in Stamford Hill, in the London Borough of Hackney, England.

History
On 11 January 1904, the Servite Sisters founded a small independent school called Our Lady's School, with Sr M. Phillipa as its first headmistress. The school later moved to 14-16 Amhurst Park during the 1930s. There were 27 pupils aged 10 and over; all the staff were Servite sisters; parents paid fees of £2/10/00 per term. The rooms in the house built in the 1800s were used as classrooms. There was a grass tennis court in the garden. The school has since expanded and the premises consist of the original buildings and newer additions (the most recent in 2003). The first lay headteacher, only the sixth in the school's history, was appointed in 1994. Our Lady's is no longer directly run by the Servites but remains under their trusteeship.

Current structure

Our Lady's is a Voluntary Aided Roman Catholic School, which has been awarded Specialist Status as a Language College. Permission to expand by one form of entry has meant that the school's total number is currently 780 students. The Sixth Form Centre admits boys and girls and has currently 180 students.

Our Lady's has four tutor groups: Hugh (H), which uses the house colour blue, Juliana (J), which uses the house colour red, Manettus (M), which uses the house colour yellow and Philomena (P), which uses the house colour green.

In September 2010, the school became split site, since as part of the Building Schools for Future (BSF), the school is to be completely remodelled and rebuilt. The lower school (years 7 and 8) still remains at the old site in Stamford Hill. The upper school (years 9, 10, 11 plus sixth form) have moved to Upper Clapton, occupying a building put up for the lower school of The Skinners' Company's School for Girls. The rebuilding of the school was finished in Autumn 2012. The School came together, back on one site, in September 2012.

Mr Andy English took on the headship in March 2022. Ofsted visited in March 2022 and reaffirmed the school's rating as 'Good'.

Departments of the school
There are 19 departments in the school.
Art
Business studies
Classical studies
Citizenship
Technology
English
Geography
Government and politics
Drama
Health and Social Care
History
ICT
Mathematics
Modern languages
Music
Psychology
Physical education
Religious studies
Science
Sociology
Economics

Notable former pupils
Freema Agyeman, actress, Doctor Who as Martha Jones, attended the school circa 1990s
Moira Stuart, BBC broadcaster and newsreader
Dame Barbara Windsor, actress, BBC soap opera EastEnders,  attended the school circa 1940s-1950s (left without graduating)

References

Secondary schools in the London Borough of Hackney
Girls' schools in London
Catholic secondary schools in the Archdiocese of Westminster
Servite schools
Voluntary aided schools in London
Educational institutions established in 1904
Stamford Hill
1904 establishments in England